Phisqa Quta (Aymara phisqa five, quta lake, "five lakes'", also  spelled Pesca Kkota) is a mountain in the eastern extensions of the Cordillera Real in the Andes of Bolivia which reaches a height of approximately . It is situated in the La Paz Department, Murillo Province, La Paz Municipality. Phisqa Quta lies southeast of Janq'u K'ark'a and Sankayuni.

References 

Mountains of La Paz Department (Bolivia)